Lucien "Sonny" Banks (June 29, 1940 – May 13, 1965) was a mid-20th Century American boxer who is primarily  remembered for being the first boxer to ever knock down Cassius Clay (later "Muhammad Ali") in a professional match. In the early 1960s Banks was regarded in the sport as rising prospect known for a lightning fast left hook, but his career was cut short when he died from injuries sustained in the ring in 1965.

Early life
Banks was from Lee County in North-East Mississippi. He was born in the farming community at Birmingham Ridge, about halfway between Tupelo and Saltillo.

Boxing career
He fought Clay on 10 February 1962 in New York, and knocked him down for a count, although he went on to lose the match.

Death
Banks died on 13 May 1965 at the age of 24 from a head injury sustained three days earlier in a 9-round bout against Leotis Martin. His body was buried at Westlawn Cemetery in Wayne, Michigan.

Professional boxing record

References

 West Side Boxing News: "15 Round: The True Championship Distance"

1940 births
1965 deaths
Boxers from Mississippi
People from Lee County, Mississippi
Heavyweight boxers
Deaths due to injuries sustained in boxing
Sports deaths in Pennsylvania
American male boxers
African-American boxers
20th-century African-American sportspeople